Bhandarkot Union is a union parishad in Batiaghata Upazila of Khulna District, in Khulna Division, Bangladesh.

References

Unions of Batiaghata Upazila
Populated places in Khulna District